Crosswize is a shoot 'em up released by Firebird in 1988 for the ZX Spectrum home computer.  It was the sequel to Sidewize.

Plot
The planet Luna is under attack by Mutants and must be defended.

Overview
The game is very similar to its predecessor, with a lone warrior battling waves of alien enemies. A notable difference is the ability to fire in both directions, as in Side Arms. Again, power-ups may be collected for improved weapons and firepower.

Development
Crosswize was published by Firebird Software. A sequel to Sidewize, it was programmed by Steve Wetherill and Colin Grunes, who designed the previous game.

Reception

Your Sinclair: "Addictiveness? Is this game addictive? We are talking fail your exams, lose your job, break up your marriage, and even don't wash your hair-type addictiveness. You keep pounding the joystick, trying to get past that building to see what will kill you next. Have another go, and another, just one more, and another, one more time..."
Sinclair User: "A terrific shoot-em-up and classic blast. Violent escapism at its best."

References

External links

ZX Spectrum games
ZX Spectrum-only games
1988 video games
Shoot 'em ups
Telecomsoft games
Video games developed in the United Kingdom